Midde Hamrin (born Ingrid Marie-Louise Hamrin, April 19, 1957 in Gothenburg, Västra Götaland) is a Swedish athlete, competing in the long-distance running events.

She played basketball with the Högsbo Division I Basketball Club in Gothenburg, Sweden from 1975-1978. In 1977, she spent the spring and summer in Los Angeles with American Högsbo basketball coach, Richard Wohlstadter. She began her track career there, training at the UCLA track and along the famous grass on San Vicente Blvd. She later received a  scholarship to Lamar University in Texas where she played varsity basketball and ran track. It was there she met Andy Senorski, the track coach at Lamar. They later married, moved to Sweden, and had two children.

Achievements

References

External links 
 
 

1957 births
Living people
Athletes from Gothenburg
Swedish women's basketball players
Swedish female long-distance runners
Swedish female marathon runners
Swedish masters athletes
Athletes (track and field) at the 1984 Summer Olympics
Olympic athletes of Sweden
Lamar Lady Cardinals track and field athletes
Chicago Marathon female winners
Swedish Athletics Championships winners
Swedish expatriate sportspeople in the United States